SG Dynamo Berlin was the original name of SG Dynamo Hohenschönhausen. However, the Dynamo Berlin name more commonly refers to:

BFC Dynamo
SC Dynamo Berlin